Chris Richard (born December 25, 1984) is an American former professional basketball player. Richard, a power forward, played college basketball for the University of Florida. He has a wingspan of 7'4½". His role was that of the sixth man that came off the bench for the Florida Gators national championship men's team during the 2006–07 season. He is a former Mr. Basketball in the state of Florida (2002) and scored 8 points to go along with 8 rebounds (5 offensive) in his final game of his college career. He was taken 1st overall in 2008 D-League draft by the Tulsa 66ers.

In the 2007–08 NBA season, Richard played 52 games with the Minnesota Timberwolves. Richard signed with the Chicago Bulls during the 2009–10 NBA season. He played 18 regular season games, and was waived on June 30, 2010.

NBA career statistics

Regular season 

|-
| align="left" | 
| align="left" | Minnesota
| 52 || 3 || 10.7 || .471 || .000 || .593 || 2.6 || .3 || .2 || .2 || 1.9
|-
| align="left" | 
| align="left" | Chicago
| 18 || 0 || 12.4 || .517 || .000 || .636 || 3.3 || .4 || .4 || .2 || 2.1
|-
| align="left" | Career
| align="left" | 
| 70 || 3 || 11.1 || .4u3 || .000 || .605 || 2.8 || .4 || .3 || .2 || 1.9

Playoffs

|-
| align="left" | 2010
| align="left" | Chicago
| 2 || 0 || 2.5 || .000 || .000 || .000 || 1.5 || .0 || .0 || .0 || .0
|-
| align="left" | Career
| align="left" | 
| 2 || 0 || 2.5 || .000 || .000 || .000 || 1.5 || .0 || .0 || .0 || .0

See also 

 List of Florida Gators in the NBA

References

External links 

 
Chris Richard's college stats
NBA D-League profile
Chris Richard CBA profile (Chinese)

1984 births
Living people
African-American basketball players
American expatriate basketball people in China
American men's basketball players
Basketball players from Florida
Chicago Bulls players
Florida Gators men's basketball players
Liaoning Flying Leopards players
Minnesota Timberwolves draft picks
Minnesota Timberwolves players
Power forwards (basketball)
Sioux Falls Skyforce players
Sportspeople from Lakeland, Florida
Tulsa 66ers players
21st-century African-American sportspeople
20th-century African-American people